Rhynchospora fusca (vernacular name: brown beak-sedge) is a species of sedge belonging to the family Cyperaceae.

Its native range is Europe, Central and Eastern Canada to Northern Central and Eastern USA.

References

fusca